Romford Hockey Club (RHC) is a hockey club located in Gidea Park, Romford, in the London Borough of Havering. It was founded in 1920.

RHC currently has three men's teams competing in the East leagues, two women's teams competing in the Essex Hockey leagues, and a youth section.

External links
Romford Hockey Club

Sport in the London Borough of Havering
English field hockey clubs
1920 establishments in England
Field hockey clubs established in 1920
Romford